Enkhbatyn Badar-Uugan (born June 3, 1985 in Ulaanbaatar) is a retired boxer from Mongolia who became the first Olympic boxing champion from his country when he won the gold medal in the Bantamweight (-54 kg) division at the 2008 Olympics. He was the second Mongolian to win Olympic gold in any sport, with judoka Naidangiin Tüvshinbayar winning the first only a few days earlier.

Career
At the 2006 Asian Games winning the bronze medal in a lost bout against Korea's Han Soon Chul 19-29-.

At the world championships 2007 he won Silver when he beat Englishman Joe Murray 20-11 but lost in the finals to Sergey Vodopyanov 14-16.

In 2007, he won a gold medal at Asian Senior Boxing Championship, Ulaanbaatar.

Badar-Uugan fought for Mongolia at the 2008 Summer Olympics in Beijing.  American magazine Sports Illustrated picked him as the favorite to win Mongolia's first ever Olympic gold medal., which, however, was won by Naidangiin Tüvshinbayar, who competed earlier in the games.

World Amateur Championships results 
2007
Defeated Clive Atwell (Guyana) 25-8
Defeated Vittorio Parrinello (Italy) 19-14
Defeated David Oltvanyi (Hungary) 17-5
Defeated Héctor Manzanilla (Venezuela) RSCI 3
Defeated Joe Murray (England) 20-11
Lost to Sergey Vodopyanov (Russia) 14-16

Olympic Games results 
2008
Defeated Óscar Valdez (Mexico) 15-4
Defeated John Joe Nevin (Ireland) 9-2
Defeated Khumiso Ikgopoleng (Botswana) 15-2
Defeated Veaceslav Gojan (Moldova) 15-2
Defeated Yankiel León (Cuba) 16-5

References

External links
 

1985 births
Living people
Bantamweight boxers
Boxers at the 2008 Summer Olympics
Olympic boxers of Mongolia
Olympic gold medalists for Mongolia
Sportspeople from Ulaanbaatar
Olympic medalists in boxing
Asian Games medalists in boxing
Boxers at the 2006 Asian Games
Medalists at the 2008 Summer Olympics
Mongolian male boxers
AIBA World Boxing Championships medalists
Asian Games bronze medalists for Mongolia

Medalists at the 2006 Asian Games
21st-century Mongolian people